Pâté chaud, "hot pastry pie"), also known as bánh patê sô, is a Vietnamese savory puff pastry. The pastry is made of a light layered and flaky exterior with a meat filling. Traditionally, the filling consists of ground pork but chicken and beef are also commonly used now. This pastry is French-inspired but is now commonly found in bakeries in both Vietnam and the diaspora, much like the Haitian patty.

Etymology
The masculine French noun "pâté" in combination with "chaud" (hot) was the name of the "hot pie" in French colonial Vietnam. It was the same usage as in France at the time; for example, Urbain Dubois (1818–1901), in his La Cuisine classique of 1868, describes Pâté-chaud à la Marinière as a moulded meat pie. However, this wording is now obsolete in modern French where a pie is designated tourte, and pâté simply means "mixture of finely chopped meat". However, the more appropriate translation for the Vietnamese bánh patê sô would be "pâté en croûte", aka "mixture of meat in crust".

See also
 Vietnamese cuisine
 Puff pastry
 List of pastries

References

External links
 French Loan Words in Vietnam

Vietnamese pastries
Vietnamese words and phrases